Bicho do Mato is the fifth album from Brazilian blues/rock band O Bando do Velho Jack, and was released in 2007.

Track listing

References

2007 albums
O Bando do Velho Jack albums